Robert Laforest (born May 19, 1963) is a Canadian former professional ice hockey player who played for the Los Angeles Kings in the National Hockey League. He is the younger brother of former NHL goalie Mark Laforest. Laforest was born in Sault Ste. Marie, Ontario.

Playing career
Laforest was drafted by the Kings in the fifth round, 87th overall, in the 1983 NHL Entry Draft, after not being selected the two previous years even though he was eligible. Laforest played only 5 games in the NHL all during the 1983–84 season. The highlight of his NHL career occurred in the first game of the 1983–84 season, when Laforest scored his only NHL goal against Minnesota North Stars goaltender Gilles Meloche. After his 5 NHL games Laforest was sent to the minors where he split time between the New Haven Nighthawks and the Hershey Bears of the American Hockey League. The following year Laforest began a two-year stint in the International Hockey League (IHL) playing for the Indianapolis Checkers, Fort Wayne Komets, and Milwaukee Admirals.

After his playing career Laforest moved to Welland, Ontario, and became a real estate agent, working as a sales representative with Re/Max Welland Realty Ltd.

References

External links

1963 births
Living people
Canadian ice hockey forwards
Fort Wayne Komets players
Hershey Bears players
Sportspeople from Sault Ste. Marie, Ontario
Indianapolis Checkers players
Los Angeles Kings draft picks
Los Angeles Kings players
Milwaukee Admirals (IHL) players
New Haven Nighthawks players
Niagara Falls Flyers players
North Bay Centennials players
Ice hockey people from Ontario